Canton High School may refer to:

Canton High School (Cardiff), now Cantonian High School 
Canton High School (Connecticut)
Canton High School (Massachusetts)
Canton High School (Illinois)
Canton High School (Mississippi), a Mississippi Landmark
Plymouth-Canton Educational Park in Michigan
Hugh C. Williams Senior High School in Canton, New York
Canton High School (Texas), in Canton, Texas
Canton South High School, in Canton, Ohio